Kennedy Ochieng (born 30 December 1971) is a retired Kenyan sprinter who specialized in the 400 metres.  He was the flagbearer for Kenya at the 2000 Summer Olympics in Sydney.

Achievements

External links

1971 births
Living people
Kenyan male sprinters
Athletes (track and field) at the 1996 Summer Olympics
Athletes (track and field) at the 2000 Summer Olympics
Olympic athletes of Kenya
World Athletics Championships medalists
Athletes (track and field) at the 1998 Commonwealth Games
Commonwealth Games competitors for Kenya
African Games gold medalists for Kenya
African Games medalists in athletics (track and field)
Athletes (track and field) at the 1999 All-Africa Games